Sandscale Haws is a national nature reserve on the Duddon Estuary, Cumbria, England.  It is managed by the National Trust. Resident species include the natterjack toad.

Industrial history
Sandscale brick and tile works appears on the 1850 Ordnance Survey map.

The Sandscale Mining Company was formed in 1877 by members of the Millom & Askham Company.  The lease was signed by the then landowner Thomas Woodburne.  Thomas Woodburne also built Sandscale cottages in 1882, which were rented to the mine captains.  The mines were taken over by Kennedy Brothers in 1893 and worked until 1905 but the pumps were kept running at Sandscale No2 to assist at Roanhead.  The steam pumping engine was replaced by an electric pump in 1928.  The headgear was removed and the shaft covered in 1937.

Myles Burton Kennedy trained the local yeomanry here, the range can be seen on the 1905 OS map.
During the war, the dunes were used as a decoy site and several brick structures remain from this period.

In 1954 the estate was bought by British Cellophane who built the present farmhouse and demolished the old one.  Shortly before BCL Barrow was closed, the present nature reserve was sold to the National Trust by Courtaulds.

Ecology
The reserve's sand dunes support a population of natterjack toads (Bufo calamita). The species, which is nationally rare in Britain, is adapted to breed in ephemeral waterbodies. Another amphibian present is the great crested newt (Triturus cristatus).

Protection
Sandscale Haws was formerly a separate Site of Special Scientific Interest, but in 1990 it was amalgamated with other SSSIs to form the Duddon Estuary SSSI. It is also protected under the European Union´s Directives relating to wildlife and nature conservation.
 The Duddon Estuary is a Special Protection Area under the Birds Directive. Sandscale Haws provides high tide roosts for waders and wildfowl.
 Sandscale Haws is included in the Morecambe Bay Special Area of Conservation under the Habitats Directive

Facilities
There is a car park from with access by boardwalk to the beach and to the pools used by amphibians.

See also
+ National nature reserves in Cumbria

References

External links
NT website

Defunct mining companies of the United Kingdom
Dunes of England
Landforms of Cumbria
National Trust properties in Cumbria
Nature reserves in Cumbria
Sites of Special Scientific Interest notified in 1983